Usson may refer to:

Places
Usson is the name or part of the name of several communes in France:

 Usson, Puy-de-Dôme in the Puy-de-Dôme département
 Usson-en-Forez in the Loire département
 Usson-du-Poitou in the Vienne département

Others
 Château d'Usson, a castle in the Ariège département

See also
 Uson (disambiguation)